William Brant, Jr. (1840 – March 2, 1898) was an American soldier who fought in the American Civil War. Brant received the country's highest award for bravery during combat, the Medal of Honor, for his action at Petersburg, Virginia on 3 April 1865. He was honored with the award on 10 May 1865.

Brant joined the 1st New Jersey Volunteer Infantry in May 1861, and was commissioned as an officer in February 1865. He mustered out with his regiment in June 1865.

Medal of Honor citation

See also

List of American Civil War Medal of Honor recipients: A–F

References

1840 births
1898 deaths
People of New Jersey in the American Civil War
Union Army officers
United States Army Medal of Honor recipients
American Civil War recipients of the Medal of Honor
Burials at Evergreen Cemetery (Hillside, New Jersey)